Batumi Bay is a bay in the Black Sea near Batumi, Adjara.

References

Geography of Adjara
Bays of Georgia (country)